Tumpat Football Association commonly known as Tumpat FA is a football team based in Kota Bharu, Kelantan. They play in Malaysia FAM League. In 2012, the team was promoted to play in Malaysia FAM League. In 2014, Tumpat FA has withdrawn from competition because financial issue. Tumpat FA is not Kelantan FA second team.

Sponsorship

Kit manufacturers and financial sponsor

Stadium
Sultan Muhammad IV Stadium in Kota Bharu, Kelantan is their ground. The capacity of the stadium is 30,000. They share the stadium with Kelantan FA and become their ground since 2013.

Current squad

Mael Totey
Jefry Thomas
Malek Yousow

2014 Transfers

Transfers

Out

Officials

Backroom staff

Managerial history

Coaches

Honours

Affiliated Clubs
  Kelantan FA

References

External links
 Tumpat FA at Facebook

Football clubs in Malaysia